In mathematics, especially in an area of abstract algebra known as representation theory, a faithful representation ρ of a group  on a vector space  is a linear representation in which different elements  of  are represented by distinct linear mappings .
In more abstract language, this means that the group homomorphism  is injective (or one-to-one).

Caveat
Consider for example the natural representation of the symmetric group  in  dimensions by permutation matrices, which is certainly faithful. Here the order of the group is  while the  matrices form a vector space of dimension .

Properties

Also,  is faithful (as a representation) if and only if every irreducible representation of  occurs as a subrepresentation of
 
(the -th tensor power of the representation ) for a sufficiently high .

References

Representation theory